Deoxyribonuclease-1-like 2 is an enzyme that in humans is encoded by the DNASE1L2 gene.

Model organisms

Model organisms have been used in the study of DNASE1L2 function. A conditional knockout mouse line, called Dnase1l2tm1(KOMP)Wtsi was generated as part of the International Knockout Mouse Consortium program — a high-throughput mutagenesis project to generate and distribute animal models of disease to interested scientists.

Male and female animals underwent a standardized phenotypic screen to determine the effects of deletion. Twenty three tests were carried out on mutant mice and eight significant abnormalities were observed. Homozygous mutant animals had a decreased body weight, grip strength and bone mineral content; a kinked tail, abnormal indirect calorimetry and femur/tibia morphology. Females also had an increased blood urea nitrogen level while males had a decreased leukocyte cell number.

References

Further reading

Genes mutated in mice